Aleksandr Lvovich Oreshkin (born 15 July 1961) is a Russian former professional darts player  who played in Professional Darts Corporation (PDC) events.

Career
Oreshkin qualified for the 2016 PDC World Darts Championship after defeating Anton Kolesov in the final of the Russian Qualifier. He played against Singapore's Paul Lim in the preliminary round, winning in a sudden-death leg to qualify for a first round match against 14th seed Mervyn King. Oreshkin won the first two sets before King took nine of the next 12 legs to win 3–2. Oreshkin partnered Boris Koltsov at the World Cup of Darts and they lost 5–3 to the Netherlands in round one.

Oreshkin and Koltsov met Australia in the second round of the 2017 World Cup after seeing off Hong Kong 5–3 in the first round. Oreshkin beat Kyle Anderson 4–2, but Koltsov failed to win against Simon Whitlock meaning a doubles match was required to settle the tie. Russia easily won 4–0 to make it through to the quarter-finals for the first time, where they could only pick up one leg in their singles defeats to the Welsh pair of Gerwyn Price and Mark Webster. After losing 2-0 to Kevin Münch of Germany in the Preliminary Round of the 2018 World Championship he qualified for the World Cup again, but lost with Koltsov to Spain in the first round. He failed to qualify for the 2019 World Championship.

Oreshkin quit the PDC in January 2019.

World Championship results

PDC
 2016: First round (lost to Mervyn King 2–3) (sets) 
 2018: Preliminary round (lost to Kevin Münch 2–0)

Performance timeline

PDC

References

External links

Living people
Russian darts players
Place of birth missing (living people)
1961 births
PDC World Cup of Darts Russian team
Professional Darts Corporation associate players